Maria Chessa Lai (Monti, 15 February 1922 - Alghero, 7 February 2012) was a poet writing in the Catalan Algherese dialect. She was three times winner of the Premio Ozieri awarded annually for the best new poetry written in a Sardinian minority language.  As a bilingual poet she published her poems simultaneously in Algherese and Italian.  The majority of her work was collected together and published in the volume La Mia Mar in 2005. 
Sixty nine of her poems translated into english were published in 2021, in a bilingual Catalan/English edition, under the title: Collected Poems/ Recull de poesies de l'Alguer—including this extract from the poem called Marçanella Helichrysum Golden Sun

... Within its flowers
the reflection of clear light.
And when in the quiet of those hours
the flower that bloomed then desists
upon the path at the rim
of the crumbling abyss
it yet persists intenser in strength
within its aromatic existence.

Maria was the mother of the journalist, academic, and author Pasquale Chessa.

Bibliography 
 La Mia Mar, Edes, Sassari, 2005 
 Collected Poems/ Recull de poesies de l'Alguer 2021

Notes

External links 
 http://www.luigiladu.it/poesias/Elenco_poeti/chessa_lai_maria.htm Biography and poetry in original languages.
 http://fch.uniss.it/pen/Prizes/PortNimfeu.html Trilingual version of the prize winning Bay of Nymphs

1922 births
2012 deaths
Catalan-language poets
People from Alghero
Italian women poets
Poets from Catalonia
Italian poets
20th-century Spanish poets
20th-century Italian women writers
Sardinian women